There have been two Ilford rail crashes:

Ilford rail crash (1915)
Ilford rail crash (1944)